Emma Barrie (born 13 April 2002) is a Scottish netball player who plays for Scotland and for Sirens Netball club in the positions of goal keeper or goal shooter.

Emma made her senior international debut for Scotland during the 2019 Netball World Cup. She was introduced into the team by the Scottish national team captain Claire Maxwell and Emma Barrie was also the youngest player to play at the 2019 Vitality Netball World Cup tournament at the age of 17. Her career best was against Australia in the 2022 Commonwealth Games by scoring 99 goals.

References 

2002 births
Living people
Scottish netball players
2019 Netball World Cup players
Netball Superleague players
Sirens Netball players